Óscar Sánchez (born 13 January 1967) is a Spanish wrestler. He competed in the men's Greco-Roman 74 kg at the 1988 Summer Olympics.

References

1967 births
Living people
Spanish male sport wrestlers
Olympic wrestlers of Spain
Wrestlers at the 1988 Summer Olympics
People from Marina Alta
Sportspeople from the Province of Alicante
20th-century Spanish people